"Someday at Christmas" is a song by American singer Stevie Wonder, from his first Christmas album and same-titled eighth studio album (1967). Written by Ron Miller and Bryan Wells, it was produced by Henry R. Crosby. Initially released as a standalone single in 1966, it led to the recording of its parent album which was issued a year later. Described retrospectively as "a modern holiday classic", "Someday at Christmas" gained greater popularity with the version released by the Jackson 5 in 1970 on the Jackson 5 Christmas Album, with younger brother Michael Jackson singing lead with "youthful exuberance", according to Ebony magazine.

In 2015, Wonder recorded a duet version with Andra Day for an Apple Inc. TV commercial, which re-entered the charts.

Track listing

Charts

Lizzo version

American singer and rapper Lizzo released a cover of "Someday at Christmas" on November 10, 2022, exclusively on Amazon Music. Lizzo chose to cover the song "not just because it's a classic, but because it's a reminder to us that almost 60 years later, we are still fighting for peace, compassion, and equality." She performed her version during her guest appearance on Saturday Night Live on December 17, 2022. Lizzo's version peaked at number 59 on the Billboard Hot 100, outperforming Wonder's original.

Charts

References

1966 singles
1966 songs
American Christmas songs
Stevie Wonder songs
Tamla Records singles
Songs written by Stevie Wonder